I Told You So is the second studio album by Chino XL released by Metro Records on August 21, 2001. The album peaked at #98 on the Billboard R&B Albums chart. Kool G Rap has a guest appearance on the song "Let 'Em Live," which was released as a single. It was originally slated to be released by Warner Bros. Records, and the catalogue number 47710 was assigned to the release, but Chino XL was dropped by the label shortly after the previously mentioned single was released.

Track listing

References

2001 albums
Chino XL albums
Warner Records albums